Phocides is a genus of butterflies in the skipper family, Hesperiidae, in which it is placed in tribe Phocidini, of which it is the namesake genus.

The distribution of the genus is primarily Neotropical, but a few species occur in the Nearctic.

Species 
 Phocides belus Godman & Salvin, [1893] - Mexico
 Phocides charon (C. & R. Felder, 1859) - Brazil, Paraguay
 Phocides distans (Herrich-Schäffer, 1869)
 P. distans distans - Venezuela
 P. distans licinus  (Möschler, 1879) - Colombia, Panama
 P. distans silva  Evans, 1952 - Peru
 Phocides johnsoni Bell, 1947 - Colombia
 Phocides lincea (Herrich-Schäffer, 1869) - Brazil
 Phocides metrodorus Bell, 1932
 P. metrodorus metrodorus - Colombia
 P. metrodorus metron Evans, 1952 - Paraguay
 P. metrodorus nigrescens  Bell, 1938 - Colombia
 Phocides novalis Evans, 1952 - Peru
 Phocides oreides (Hewitson, [1875]) 
 P. oreides colombiana Bell, 1938 - Colombia
 P. oreides oreides (Hewitson, [1875]) - Peru, Bolivia
 Phocides padrona Evans, 1952 - Peru
 Phocides partia Evans, 1952 - Peru
 Phocides perkinsi (Kaye, 1931) - Jamaica
 Phocides perillus (Mabille, 1888) - Colombia
 Phocides petroleum Siewert, Leviski, Mielke & Casagrande, 2018 - Colombia
 Phocides pialia (Hewitson, 1857) - Mexico to Brazil
 P. pialia pialia - Brazil
 P. pialia intermedia Mielke, 1992  - Brazil (Minas Gerais)
 P. pialia maximus (Mabille, 1888)  - Brazil
 Phocides pigmalion (Cramer, [1779]) – mangrove skipper – south Florida to Argentina, Antilles, Colombia, Mexico
 P. pigmalion pigmalion (Cramer, [1779])
 P. pigmalion bicolora (Boddaert, 1783)
 P. pigmalion batabano (Lucas, 1857) - Cuba, Tropical America
 P. pigmalion okeechobee (Worthington, 1881) - Florida
 P. pigmalion hewitsonius (Mabille, 1883) - Brazil (Amazonas), Peru, Bolivia
 P. pigmalion batabanoides (Holland, 1903) - Bahamas
 Phocides polybius (Fabricius, 1793) – guava skipper – southern Texas, Mexico to Argentina, Central America, South America
 P. polybius polybius - Suriname, Guyana
 P. polybius lilea (Reakirt, [1867])  - Texas, Mexico to Colombia, Brazil
 P. polybius phanias (Burmeister, 1880) - Argentina, Brazil
 Phocides thermus (Mabille, 1883) - Central America
 P. thermus thermus - Colombia
 P. thermus valgus (Mabille, 1883) - French Guiana
 P. thermus bellina  Evans, 1952  - Ecuador
 Phocides urania (Westwood, [1852]) - Mexico, Texas
 Phocides vida  (Butler, 1872) - Costa Rica, Panama
 Phocides vulcanides Röber, 1925 - Colombia
 Phocides yokhara (Butler, 1870)
 P. yokhara yokhara  - Peru
 P. yokhara charonotis  (Hewitson, 1874) - Bolivia, Peru
 P. yokhara dryas  Le Cerf, 1922  - Peru
 P. yokhara inca  Le Cerf, 1922  - Peru

References 

 Natural History Museum Lepidoptera genus database
 Phocides at funet

External links 

 Images representing Phocides at Consortium for the Barcode of Life

Eudaminae
Hesperiidae of South America
Hesperiidae genera
Taxa named by Jacob Hübner